Chaco sanjuanina is a species of mygalomorph spiders of Argentina, named after its type locality: San Agustin, Valle Fertil, San Juan, Argentina. Males can be distinguished from those of its cogenerates by the more conical bulb; females differ from C. tecka in having fewer spines on the metatarsus IV, and from C. patagonica in having labial cuspules arranged in a transverse row and the more numerous maxillary ones.

Description
The labium possesses seven cuspules. The serrula is non-visible. The sternal sigilla is small, oval, and shallow, while its sternum is not rebordered. Its colour is faded, a uniform yellow, its caput being darker; the abdomen has a light chevron.

Its cephalic region is strongly convex, the fovea is sinuous and straight. Its labium has eight cuspules. The sternal sigilla is small and oval; the sternum is quite convex, not rebordered. The colour is the same as in the male.

See also
Spider anatomy
List of Nemesiidae species

References

External links
ADW entry

Nemesiidae
Spiders of Argentina
Spiders described in 1995